Fiston Mbaya Mulumba (born 27 January 1996) is a Congolese boxer. He competed in the men's lightweight event at the 2020 Summer Olympics.

References

External links
 

1996 births
Living people
Democratic Republic of the Congo male boxers
Olympic boxers of the Democratic Republic of the Congo
Boxers at the 2020 Summer Olympics
Place of birth missing (living people)
African Games competitors for DR Congo
Competitors at the 2019 African Games
21st-century Democratic Republic of the Congo people